Spectral Associates was an American maker of computer games for the TRS-80 Color Computer. It was founded in 1980 and went defunct sometime in the late 1980s. Spectral Associates sold their software through Radio Shack and via direct sales. It was a very prolific game company for the TRS-80 Color Computer I and II in its heyday.

Software Publications

Computer Games

 Cave Walker (1986, via Tandy Corporation)
 Color Meteoroids 1.6 (1981)
 Color Space Invaders 1.4 (1981)
 Color Space War (cassette)
 Cubix
 Decathlon
 Froggie
 Galagon
 Ghost Gobbler (cassette/disk)
 Ice Castles
 Interbank Incident (1985–1987)
 Lancer (1983, cassette/disk)
 Lunar Rover 1
 Lunar Rover Patrol (1983, cassette/disk)
 Keys of the Wizard (cassette)
 Madness and the Minotaur (1982, cassette)
 Maze Escape (32K and above, cassette)
 Module Man
 Ms. Gobbler (cassette/disk)
 Pegasus and the Phantom Riders (1985–1987)
 Pengon (cassette)
 Piggy (cassette)
 Planet Invasion (cassette)
 Qix
 Realm of Nauga (cassette)
 Roller Controller
 Space Sentry (cassette/disk)
 Springster (1985–1987)
 Storm Arrows (cassette/disk)
 Treasury Pack 1 (disk) - these treasuries included (not necessarily an all-inclusive list): Keys of the Wizard, Lunar Rover Patrol, Cubix, Module Man, Qix, Roller Controller, Pengon, Decathlon, Lancer, Froggie, Galagon, and Lunar Rover 1
 Treasury Pack 2 (disk)
 Whirlybird Run (1982, cassette/disk)

Computer Games (Educational)
 Alpha Search (educational, cassette/disk)

Applications/Utilities
 Clone 80cc (cassette)
 RGB Patch (disk)
 Demonstration Program (1986, Radio Shack store demo)
 Holiday Demonstration Program (1986, Radio Shack store demo)

Miscellaneous Publications

July 1980 - June 1981
 Introduced a 16K upgrade, ($75.00) an editor/assembler, plus several other utilities and one of the first games: SPACE INVADERS. They were also in the process of developing MAGIC BOX which would enable Model I & III tapes to be loaded into the Color Computer.

July 1981 - June 1982
 Color Computer technical manual (book)

July 1983 - June 1984
 Color Basic Unravelled II (book)
 Disk Basic Unravelled II (book)
 Extended Basic Unravelled II (book)
 Super Extended Basic Unravelled II (book)

Other
 The Facts for the TRS-80 Color Computer (book, Copyright (c) 1983, First printing: Nov 1981, Fifth Printing: Jul 1983)
 CoCo 3 Secrets Revealed

External links
 TRS-80 Book Covers

References 

Defunct video game companies of the United States
Video game companies established in 1980
Defunct educational software companies